Nocatee  is an unincorporated planned community located primarily in northern St. Johns County, Florida and a census-designated place (CDP). The community blends a variety of neighborhoods with schools, parks, recreation, offices, shopping, and restaurants. As of 2020, the community consists of twenty-two neighborhoods, some of which are specialized for certain age groups. Part of the development lies within Jacksonville in Duval County. It was approved in 2001 as a Development of Regional Impact (DRI) under Section 380.06 of the Florida Statutes. In addition, Nocatee is just a few minutes away from pristine beaches, golf courses, business parks and major airports in downtown Jacksonville and St. Augustine. The Nocatee vision was centered around a desire to transform the unique setting of the land into a place with a truly exceptional quality of living, while still preserving the area's peaceful beauty. By incorporating elements of "Smart Growth," Nocatee provides its residents with employment opportunities, shopping, schools, recreation and beautiful homes - everything needed for and exceptional quality of life.

History

Nocatee's creator, The PARC Group, claims that its main goal is to create communities that balance the lifestyles of its residents. The PARC Groups's Chairman and CEO, Roger O'Steen, founded the group in 1989 and was directly involved with the development of Nocatee and many other communities. He had been named Northeast Developer of the Year in 2018, and The PARC Group has been claiming this title for a consecutive 12 years. 
Donna Lundgren, the manager for the Nocatee Welcome Center, explains that the actual word "Nocatee" has roots in Timucuan Indian and translates to "peaceful river". She also states that Nocatee is "approximately 25 square miles, 14,000 acres with over 60% of remaining preserve for conservation and preservation."

Amenities

Nocatee contains two large water parks, the Splash Park and Spray Park. Each has various features, such as pools, slides, and kid specific areas. The pool areas host various events throughout the year, such as Food Truck Friday, farmers' markets, holiday celebration, concerts, Easter egg hunts, and more community events. The community contains other amenities like parks, neighborhood pools, fitness centers, dog parks, a kayak launch, a nature preserve and a series of nature trails. Two new action slides will also be added to the Spray Park, making Nocatee the first master-planned community in Northeast Florida to feature adventure rides for residents. In addition, a family swimming pool will be constructed at the Spray Water Park, featuring shallow-water seating and a beach entry. A new serenity pool will be added at the community’s popular Splash Water Park, including separate restrooms and direct access to the bar and concessions. These new additions have an expected completion date of summer 2021.

Demographics

The population of Nocatee had a 34.6% increase from the year 2015 to 2016, and it is the second fastest growing community in the nation. In addition to the growing number of houses, the number of businesses in and around the Nocatee Town Center has also been developing exponentially. With 14,747 people, Nocatee is the 241st most populated city in the state of Florida out of 919 cities. The median age for Nocatee residents is 39.8 years young. Nocatee is currently declining at a rate of 0.00% annually and its population has increased by 225.97% since the most recent census, which recorded a population of 4,524 in 2010. In 2019, Nocatee had a population of 14,747.

Events 
Nocatee hosts a variety of events consisting of trivia, on tap beer tastings, food truck Fridays, monthly farmer’s markets, as well as holiday themed events such as Easter egg hunts.

Education

St. Johns County School District is the school district of the St. Johns County portion, which includes the entire census-designated place.

The following elementary schools serve portions of the CDP: Ocean Palms, Palm Valley, Pine Island, and Valley Ridge.

Three middle schools serve portions of the CDP: Alice B. Landrum, Palm Valley, Pine Island, and Valley Ridge.

Allen D. Nease High School serves most of the Nocatee CDP, with a portion of the CDP being zoned to Ponte Vedra High School.

The official subdivisions of the Nocatee development in St. Johns County are zoned to the Palm Valley, Pine Island, and Valley Ridge K-8 schools and to Nease.

The portion in Duval County (not in the CDP) is zoned to Bartram Springs Elementary School, Twin Lakes Middle School, and Atlantic Coast High School.

See also

References

External links
 Nocatee's official web site

Unincorporated communities in St. Johns County, Florida
Neighborhoods in Jacksonville, Florida
Census-designated places in the Jacksonville metropolitan area
Planned communities in Florida
Unincorporated communities in Florida
Census-designated places in Florida